Meyna is a genus of flowering plants in the family Rubiaceae.

Distribution
The genus is found in tropical Asia, except for Meyna tetraphylla that occurs in northeastern tropical Africa and the Comoros.

Taxonomy
Based on morphology, Meyna has been suggested as likely candidate for inclusion in the Canthium subgenus Canthium. In 2004, a molecular phylogenetic study showed that Meyna tetraphylla is related to Canthium and the transfer to Canthium was suggested.

Species

 Meyna grisea (King & Gamble) Robyns
 Meyna laxiflora Robyns
 Meyna parviflora Robyns
 Meyna peltata Robyns
 Meyna pierrei Robyns
 Meyna pubescens (Kurz) Robyns
 Meyna spinosa Roxb. ex Link
 Meyna tetraphylla (Schweinf. ex Hiern) Robyns
 Meyna velutina Robyns

References

External links
 World Checklist of Rubiaceae

Rubiaceae genera
Vanguerieae